The Metcalfe Historic District in Metcalfe, Georgia is a  historic district which included 35 contributing buildings when it was listed on the National Register of Historic Places in 1978.

Principal historic resources include:
the railroad depot
Baptist church
Rushin-Willett House (1890)
Crenshaw-Thomas House (c. 1890)
Home Cotton Gin (c. 1900).

References

Historic districts on the National Register of Historic Places in Georgia (U.S. state)
Victorian architecture in Georgia (U.S. state)
Queen Anne architecture in Georgia (U.S. state)
Buildings and structures completed in 1925
National Register of Historic Places in Thomas County, Georgia